Miroir de l’âme pécheresse ("Mirror of the Sinful Soul") is a 1531 poem by Marguerite d'Angoulême. It was translated by the future Queen Elizabeth I in 1548 as A Godly Meditation of the Soul. Sorbonne theologians condemned the work as heresy. A monk said Marguerite should be sewn into a sack and thrown into the Seine. Students at the Collège de Navarre satirized her in a play as "a Fury from Hell". Her brother forced the charges to be dropped, however, and obtained an apology from the Sorbonne.

References

Further reading

See also
 The Miroir or Glasse of the Synneful Soul

French poems
English poems
16th-century poems